The canton of Aubergenville (French: Canton d'Aubergenville) is an administrative division of the Yvelines department, northern France. Its borders were modified at the French canton reorganisation which came into effect in March 2015. Its seat is in Aubergenville.

It consists of the following communes:
 
Andelu
Aubergenville
Aulnay-sur-Mauldre
Auteuil
Autouillet
Bazemont
Bazoches-sur-Guyonne
Béhoust
Boissy-sans-Avoir
Bouafle
Flexanville
Flins-sur-Seine
Galluis
Gambais
Garancières
Goupillières
Grosrouvre
Herbeville
Jouars-Pontchartrain
Marcq
Mareil-le-Guyon
Mareil-sur-Mauldre
Maule
Méré
Les Mesnuls
Millemont
Montainville
Montfort-l'Amaury
Neauphle-le-Château
Neauphle-le-Vieux
Nézel
La Queue-les-Yvelines
Saint-Germain-de-la-Grange
Saint-Rémy-l'Honoré
Saulx-Marchais
Thoiry
Le Tremblay-sur-Mauldre
Vicq
Villiers-le-Mahieu
Villiers-Saint-Frédéric

References

Cantons of Yvelines